This is a comprehensive listing of releases by the Lebanese singer, Amal Hijazi. Hijazi has released five studio albums and more 20 eighteen singles.

In 2001, Hijazi released her commercial debut album Akher Gharam which produced the hit singles "Akher Gharam", "Ghanniet", and "Habibi Oud". In 2002, she released her second studio album Zaman, which become one of the biggest selling albums of the year and establishing Hijazi as one of the leading female artists in Lebanon. She released her third album Bedawwar A Albi in 2004 followed by the release of Baya al Ward and Keef el Amar which once again saw her at number one.

In the Middle East, there are no official charts for albums or their sales or certifications due to the loose nature of the business and bootlegging. Charts of released singles are not provided and the sales are not accurate for the mentioned things will not included in this article for reliable reference.

Albums

Singles

 2001: "Rayyah Balak"
 2001: "Akher Gharam"
 2001: "Habibi Oud"
 2001: "Ghanniet"
 2002: "Einak"
 2002: "Zaman"
 2002: "Oulhali"
 2003: "Romansyia"
 2004: "Bedawwar A Albi"
 2004: "Mistanie Eiy"
 2004: "Mahabitsh Gherak"
 2005: "Ba'ad Sneen"
 2006: "Baya al Ward"
 2006: "Jnoon Bhebbak" (Feat. Rayan)
 2006: "Betsalni Meen"
 2007: "Baheb Nuoa Kalamak"
 2007: "Nefsy Tefhamny"
 2008: "Ahla Ma Fi el Ayyam"

Discographies of Lebanese artists
Discography
Folk music discographies